Witches' Sabbath is a contemporary gothic romance novel by Paula Allardyce, published in 1961 by Hodder & Stoughton. The novel won the 1961's Romantic Novel of the Year Award by the Romantic Novelists' Association.

Plot
Tamar Brown arrives in a tiny English village to research her latest book, about Abigail Parkes, who had been burned as a witch three centuries before. Tamar is a redhead, as was Abigail, and soon the superstitious villagers fear that the witch has come back from the grave to take revenge. Never mind that, though. By the most amazing coincidence, Tamar is reunited with William, the lover who left her six years ago. The suspicion of his involvement in his wife's death, the speculation that she is a reincarnation of Abigail all lead to further vengeful and nearly fatal deeds.

Awards
 1961, Romantic Novel of the Year Award by the Romantic Novelists' Association

1961 British novels
British romance novels
British Gothic novels
Contemporary romance novels
Hodder & Stoughton books